The 2012 Taiwanese legislative election was held on 16 January 2012 for all 113 seats in the Legislative Yuan. For the first time, legislative elections were held simultaneously with the presidential election. Elected parliamentarians formed the fifteenth Legislative Yuan session since 1946, when the current constitution came into effect. Voting took place on 14 January 2012 between 08:00 and 16:00 local Taipei time at 14,806 polling stations nationwide.

Electoral system 

Members were elected by parallel voting.

Subsidies
According to the "Civil Servants Election And Recall Act", subsidies are payable to the political parties who sponsor candidates for Legislative Yuan elections. Article 43 has the following specifications:
Every year the state shall apportion subsidies for campaign to the political parties, and the standard of apportionment shall be determined based on the latest election of members of the Legislative Yuan. If a ratio of vote attained by the political party achieves not less than 5% in the national integrated election and the overseas election of central civil servants, the subsidy for campaign funds shall be granted to the political party by a rate of NT$50 per vote every year.

The Central Election Commission shall work out the amount of the subsidy every fiscal year, and notify the party to prepare the receipt and receive the subsidy from the Central Election Commission within 1 month, till the tenure of the current session of the members of the Legislative Yuan expires.

Results

Subsequent by-elections

See also
Ninth Legislative Yuan

Notes

References

Legislative elections in Taiwan
Taiwan
Legislative
January 2012 events in Asia